Never Let Me Go may refer to:

Film and literature
Never Let Me Go (1953 film), a romance starring Clark Gable and Gene Tierney
Never Let Me Go (novel), a 2005 novel by Kazuo Ishiguro
Never Let Me Go (2010 film), based on the novel

Music

Albums
Never Let Me Go (Placebo album), 2022
Never Let Me Go, 2010 album by Mark Murphy
Never Let Me Go (Luther Vandross album), 1993
Never Let Me Go (Stanley Turrentine album), 1963

Songs
"Never Let Me Go", 2018 song by Jess Glynne, from the album Always in Between
"Never Let Me Go" (Florence and the Machine song), 2011
"Never Let Me Go", 2011 song by The Human League, from the album Credo
"Never Let Me Go", 2000 song by Bono and The Million Dollar Hotel Band, from The Million Dollar Hotel soundtrack
"Never Let Me Go" (The Black Sorrows song), 1990
"Never Let Me Go", 1956 song written by Evans and Livingston and sung by Nat King Cole, from the film The Scarlet Hour
"Never Let Me Go" (Johnny Ace song), 1954

See also
Never Let You Go (disambiguation)